More than one Russian naval vessel has borne the name Opyt ( "Experience"):

  was launched in 1806, captured by the British in 1808 in an epic action, renamed HMS Baltic, and then sold in 1810.
  was launched in 1861 and stricken in 1906.

In addition, the Russians commissioned four schooners and one transport/bomb vessel with the name Opyt.

Russian Navy ship names